Renato Ruggiero (9 April 1930 – 4 August 2013) was an Italian diplomat and politician. He was Director-General of the World Trade Organization from 1995 to 1999 and briefly served as Italy's Foreign Minister in 2001.

Biography
Born in Naples on 9 April 1930, Ruggiero graduated from Naples University in 1953 with a law degree, thereafter entering the foreign service. He subsequently held posts in private firms such as Fiat and the energy firm ENI. After a brilliant business career he became a top-ranking diplomat, and was involved in tough situations such as the Sigonella crisis in 1985. He was famous for his abilities as a strong-minded negotiator and thus earned the nickname of "Rocky" Ruggiero. At the time of his death in 2013, Ruggiero was an Ambassador and was working for Citigroup. He was a member of the Steering Committee of the Bilderberg Group.

Honors
 Order of Merit of the Italian Republic 1st Class / Knight Grand Cross – 3 October 1985

Ruggiero was awarded the Grand Cross of the Order of the Sacred Treasure by the government of Japan.

See also 
 Ministry of Foreign Affairs (Italy)
 Foreign relations of Italy

References

 

1930 births
2013 deaths
Foreign ministers of Italy
Citigroup people
Members of the Steering Committee of the Bilderberg Group
Permanent Representatives of Italy to the European Union
Italian diplomats
20th-century diplomats
Politicians from Naples
Directors-General of the World Trade Organization
University of Naples Federico II alumni
Recipients of the Order of the Sacred Treasure
Diplomats from Naples